Edward Hill may refer to: 

 Edward Hill (Virginian politician) (died c. 1663), Speaker of the Virginia House of Burgesses
 Edward Hill, Jr. (1637–1700), son of Edward Hill (Virginian politician), also planter, burgess and briefly Speaker
 Edward Rowley Hill (1795–1878), British Army officer
 Edward Smith Hill (1818–1880), Australian politician
 Sir Edward Stock Hill (1834–1902), English politician, MP for Bristol South 1886–1900
 Edward Hill (Medal of Honor) (1835–1900), American soldier, Medal of Honor recipient
 Edward Hill (painter) (1843–1923), American artist
 Edward H. Hill (1844–1904), physician who founded Central Maine Medical Center, Lewiston, Maine
 Edward Burlingame Hill (1872–1960), American composer
 Ted Hill, Baron Hill of Wivenhoe (Edward James Hill, 1899–1969), British trade unionist
 Edward Hill (New Zealand politician) (1907–2001), English-born New Zealand politician
 Ted Hill (Australian communist) (Edward Fowler Hill, 1915–1988), Australian lawyer
 Eduard Khil (1934–2012) or Edward Hill, Russian singer
 Eddie Hill (born 1936), American drag racer
 Edward Hill (physician) (active 1995–2006), physician and former President of the American Medical Association
 Edward Hill (Mississippi politician) (active 1867–1874), American politician and postmaster

See also 
 Ed Hill (disambiguation)
 Ned C. Hill (born 1945), American business management professor
 Ted Hill (disambiguation)
 Hill (surname)